Jesse Allen Hahn (born July 30, 1989) is an American professional baseball pitcher who is a free agent. He has played in Major League Baseball (MLB) for the San Diego Padres, Oakland Athletics and Kansas City Royals. The Tampa Bay Rays selected Hahn in the sixth round of the 2010 Major League Baseball draft.

Career

Amateur career
Hahn attended Fitch Senior High School in Groton, Connecticut. He pitched for the school's baseball team as a teammate of Matt Harvey. Hahn then attended Virginia Tech, and played college baseball for the Virginia Tech Hokies. In 2009, he played collegiate summer baseball with the Chatham Anglers of the Cape Cod Baseball League. He injured the elbow of his throwing arm in 2010, and underwent Tommy John surgery.

Tampa Bay Rays
The Tampa Bay Rays selected Hahn in the sixth round of the 2010 Major League Baseball draft. He signed with the Rays, for a $525,000 signing bonus. He did not make his professional debut until 2012 due to his recovery from Tommy John surgery. He was added to the Rays 40-man roster on November 20, 2013.

San Diego Padres
On January 22, 2014, the Rays traded Hahn and Alex Torres to the San Diego Padres in exchange for Logan Forsythe, Brad Boxberger, Matt Lollis, Matt Andriese, and Maxx Tissenbaum. Hahn was brought up from the Double-A San Antonio Missions, and made his major league debut with the Padres on June 3, 2014. He was optioned back to San Antonio the next day. He was called back up and ended the season with a 7-4 record with a 3.07 ERA in 12 starts.

Oakland Athletics
On December 18, 2014, the Padres traded Hahn and R. J. Alvarez to the Oakland Athletics for Derek Norris and Seth Streich. In 2015 he was 6-6 with a 3.35 ERA, and led the major leagues in runners reaching base due to errors, with 14. In his 3 seasons with the A's, Hahn battled numerous injuries and inconsistency, appearing in only 38 starts.

Kansas City Royals
On January 29, 2018, the Athletics traded Hahn and Heath Fillmyer to the Kansas City Royals for Brandon Moss and Ryan Buchter. After experiencing some discomfort in his UCL during the beginning of spring training, the Royals placed Hahn on the 60 day disabled list to begin the season. He ended up missing the entire 2018 season. The following season, Hahn spent the majority of the season rehabbing and in the minors, appearing in only 6 games for Kansas City. Hahn was non-tendered on December 2, 2019, and became a free agent. Hahn re-signed with the Royals on a one-year contract on December 13, 2019.

With the 2020 Kansas City Royals, Hahn  appeared in 18 games, compiling a 1-0 record with a stellar 0.52 ERA and 19 strikeouts in 17.1 innings pitched.

On May 22, 2021, Hahn was placed on the 60-day injured list with a right shoulder impingement. He became a free agent after the 2021 season.

Personal life
Hahn's older sister, Melissa, has cerebral palsy.

References

External links

Virginia Tech Hokies bio

1989 births
Living people
Sportspeople from Norwich, Connecticut
Baseball players from Connecticut
Major League Baseball pitchers
San Diego Padres players
Oakland Athletics players
Kansas City Royals players
Virginia Tech Hokies baseball players
Chatham Anglers players
Hudson Valley Renegades players
Gulf Coast Rays players
Charlotte Stone Crabs players
San Antonio Missions players
Nashville Sounds players
Arizona League Royals players
Northwest Arkansas Naturals players
Omaha Storm Chasers players